High Society is a U.S. pornographic magazine. In addition to hardcore pictorials of nude models, it also has feature articles and occasional celebrity pictorials.

History
High Society was first published in May 1976. Carl Ruderman hired the adult industry's first female men's magazine editor, Gloria Leonard, in 1977.

Leonard, an adult film star, is credited with the use of "900" and "976 phone numbers" to advertise upcoming magazine issues. This evolved into the very first "phone sex" lines.

In November 1981 a spin-off magazine, High Society Live!, debuted. Another venture was a celebrity focused publication, Celebrity Skin magazine,  in 1986. The 10th Anniversary Issue of High Society, published May, 1986 featured Gail Thackray (Gail Harris) with a 10-page spread, Centerfold and Front cover. Over its 25-year run Margot Kidder, Ann-Margret and Barbra Streisand unsuccessfully attempted to sue the magazine after it published nude photos of them.

High Society has a Pay Per View channel.

The magazine is published by the Magna Publishing Group, which was acquired by 1-800-PHONESEX on December 22, 2015.

References

External links
 

Men's magazines published in the United States
Monthly magazines published in the United States
Pornographic magazines published in the United States
Magazines established in 1976
Pornographic men's magazines
Magazines published in New Jersey